Frits Johan Vanèn (born 7 April 1933 in Amersfoort) is a Dutch painter and sculptor.

Vanèn uses universal, geometric symbols in his artworks like squares, cubes, circles. From the elements, he visualizes water and light topics. The viewer's momentary perception finds hidden laws of nature in the artworks of Frits Vanen.

Frits Vanen artworks
1969 5 years Dutch Sculpture, Centraal Museum Utrecht. 
1989 International Steel Sculpture Workshop and Symposium, Dunaújváros, Hungary
1990 The obvious, an object of observation. Municipal Museum Roermond, Dutch Sculp. Assoc.
1993 Striking Sculptures, Groeneveld /Baarn 
1994 Space for Sculptures, Doesburg/Utrecht 
1994 Radius of Action in Dialogue, Daelenbroek/ Herkenbosch.
1996 Drechtoevers Sculpture Park, Zwijndrecht 
1996 Multiples, Beerenburght Gallery, Eck en Wiel.
1996 4th International Biennial of Sculptural Drawings, Vigadó Gallery, Budapest
1997 Small- Sculpture, Townhall and gardens of Middenbeemster. 
1997 The Masters of Drawing and Graphic Arts, 1997 4th International Biennial, Györ Hungary.
1997 10th jubilee of The 4th Dimension Gallery Plasmolen

References
 Frits Vanèn at the RKD

Links
 Frits Vanen

1933 births
Living people
Dutch sculptors
Dutch male sculptors
People from Amersfoort